Phosphoamino acid analysis, or PAA, is an experimental technique used in molecular biology to determine which amino acid or acids are phosphorylated in a protein.

Technique
A protein is first phosphorylated using 32P-labeled ATP, usually via an in vitro kinase assay. Most of the amino acids 
in the protein are then hydrolyzed, usually by the use of a strong acid such as hydrochloric acid. These amino acids are then separated using 2-dimensional thin layer chromatography, along with amino acid standards for the three amino acids that are phosphorylated in eukaryotes: serine, threonine, and tyrosine. These amino acid standards can be visualized on the TLC substrate by exposure to ninhydrin, which colors the amino acids a visible purple when heated at ~100 °C. The radioactive amino acids can be detected via autoradiography, and an overlay of the two images will show which amino acids are phosphorylated.

References
Rothberg, P.G., Harris, T.J.R., Nomoto, A., and Wimmer, E. (1978) O4-(5'-uridylyl)tyrosine is the bond between the genome-linked protein and the RNA of poliovirus. Proc. Natl. Acad. Sci. USA 75, 4868-4872.
Eckhart, W., Hutchinson, M.A., and Hunter, T. (1979) An activity phosphorylating tyrosine in polyoma T antigen immunoprecipitates. Cell 18, 925-933.

Protein methods